The following lists events that happened during 1979 in Chile.

Incumbents
President of Chile: Augusto Pinochet

Events

January
9 January – The 1979 Treaty of Montevideo is signed.

February
February 3 - The XX International Song Festival of Viña del Mar is held, conducted by Antonio Vodanovic and María Graciela Gómez.

March

April
April 18 - Relatives of disappeared detainees are chained in the building of the former National Congress, where the Ministry of Justice worked. Again they get no response.

May
May 3 - The newspaper La Estrella del Loa is founded, edited in Calama.
May 5 - The Cobresal soccer team of El Salvador is founded.

June
June 3 - The minor Rodrigo Anfruns is kidnapped. The fact causes great commotion in the country. His body appears eleven days later, sowing doubt about the culprits.
June 5 - The Center-Left Social Democratic Movement between 1979 and 1985 is founded.
June 29 - Finance Minister Sergio de Castro announces that the exchange rate of the peso against the dollar will be fixed, establishing it at 39 pesos.

July
July 1 - The first personal stereo arrives in Chile.

August
August 22 - The Fausto nightclub opens its doors, the first venue of its kind for the LGBT public in Chile.

September
September 18 - General Augusto Pinochet signs the decree declaring the cueca "national dance of Chile".

October
October 23 -  Coihuín tragedy: intense rains cause the collapse of a hill in the coastal town of Coihuín, in the commune of Puerto Montt, crushing ten people, all algae collectors.
October 26 - Decree Laws 2867 and 2868 are published in the Official Gazette, redrawing provincial and communal boundaries throughout Chile. New communes are created such as Ollagüe in the province of El Loa, Antofagasta Region, and Hualaihué in the Los Lagos Region.

November
November 13 - The Vicaría de la Solidaridad denounces the burial of nearly 3,000 corpses in Patio 29 of the General Cemetery of Santiago, corresponding mostly to disappeared detainees.
November 29 - The latest edition of El Tarapacá de Iquique circulates.
30 November-1 December – 1979 Chilean telethon

Births
12 February – Patricio Ormazábal
27 July – Rodolfo Moya
30 July – Roberto Bruce (d. 2011)
9 August – Matías Bize
25 August – Cristián Reynero
11 September – David Pizarro
12 September – Denisse van Lamoen
6 October – Gonzalo Miranda
10 October – Nicolás Massú
14 October – Rodrigo Tello

Deaths
21 July – Juan Guzmán Cruchaga (b. 1895)

References 

 
Years of the 20th century in Chile
Chile